Cleone Santos Silva (born 21 November 1989), known by Cleo Silva, is a Brazilian footballer who currently plays as a forward for Novorizontino

Career statistics

Club

Notes

References

1989 births
Living people
Brazilian footballers
Association football forwards
Campeonato Brasileiro Série B players
Campeonato Brasileiro Série C players
Campeonato Brasileiro Série D players
Rio Preto Esporte Clube players
Grêmio de Esportes Maringá players
Foz do Iguaçu Futebol Clube players
Grêmio Novorizontino players
Itumbiara Esporte Clube players
Parauapebas Futebol Clube players
Boa Esporte Clube players
Cuiabá Esporte Clube players
Joinville Esporte Clube players
Botafogo Futebol Clube (SP) players
Luverdense Esporte Clube players
Esporte Clube São Bento players
Operário Ferroviário Esporte Clube players